Halis Özkahya (born 30 May 1980) is a Turkish football referee. He officiated the 2012–13 UEFA Europa League group stage match between Lyon and Ironi Kiryat Shmona.

He became a FIFA referee in 2009. He has served as a referee in 2014 World Cup qualifying, beginning with the Group C match between Germany and Kazakhstan.

References

External links
 

1980 births
Living people
People from Kütahya
Turkish football referees
UEFA Europa League referees